Bolesław Drobiński  (23 October 191826 July 1995) was a Polish fighter ace of the Polish Air Force in World War II with 7 confirmed kills and one shared.

Biography
Drobiński made his first flight on a glider in 1934. On 2 January 1938 he entered the Polish Air Force Academy in Dęblin. After the Invasion of Poland he was evacuated to France via Romania and Italy, then he came to England.

On 11 September 1940 Drobiński was assigned to the No. 65 Squadron RAF and took part in the Battle of Britain. On 2 March 1941 he was posted to the No. 303 Polish Fighter Squadron. On 15 May 1941 he damaged a Ju 52 which was on the ground. On 21 June 1941 Drobiński heavily damaged the plane flown by German ace Adolf Galland and forced him to a crash-landing. From 18 March 1942 to 9 August 1942 he was an instructor in No. 58 Operational Training Unit at RAF Grangemouth. On 18 October 1943 he was ordered to No. 317 Polish Fighter Squadron. On 3 April 1944 he began to work in the Ministry of Defence. On 26 September 1944 he took command of No.303 Polish Fighter Squadron.

Drobiński was demobilized in 1948. He worked in the oil industry in America. In 1950's he settled in a village in Surrey. In 1960 he obtained British citizenship. In 1969 he acted as a technical advisor for the Battle of Britain. In 1943 he married a South African woman, they had two sons and a daughter.

Aerial victory credits
 18 June 1941 – 2 Bf 109
 21 June 1941 – Bf 109
 22 June 1941 – Bf 109
 25 June 1941 – Bf 109
 3 July 1941 – Bf 109
 6 July 1941 – 1/3 Bf 109 (probably destroyed)
 7 July 1941 – 1/2
 24 July 1941 – Bf 109 (probably destroyed)
 24 October 1941 – Bf 109 (probably destroyed)
 13 March 1942 – Bf 109

Awards
 Virtuti Militari, Silver Cross 
 Cross of Valour (Poland), three times
 Distinguished Flying Cross (United Kingdom)

References

Bibliography
 Tadeusz Jerzy Krzystek, Anna Krzystek: Polskie Siły Powietrzne w Wielkiej Brytanii w latach 1940-1947 łącznie z Pomocniczą Lotniczą Służbą Kobiet (PLSK-WAAF). Sandomierz: Stratus, 2012, p. 161. 
 Jerzy Pawlak: Absolwenci Szkoły Orląt: 1925-1939. Warszawa: Retro-Art, 2009, pp. 231–232. 
 Piotr Sikora: Asy polskiego lotnictwa. Warszawa: Oficyna Wydawnicza Alma-Press. 2014, p. 282-285. 
 Józef Zieliński: Asy polskiego lotnictwa. Warszawa: Agencja lotnicza ALTAIR, 1994, p. 43. ISBN 83862172. 
 Józef Zieliński: Lotnicy polscy w Bitwie o Wielką Brytanię. Warszawa: Oficyna Wydawnicza MH, 2005, pp. 39–40. 
 Józef Zieliński: 303 Dywizjon Myśliwski Warszawski im. Tadeusza Kościuszki. Warszawa: Bellona, 2003

Further reading
 
 
 
 

The Few
Recipients of the Distinguished Flying Cross (United Kingdom)
Polish World War II flying aces
Recipients of the Silver Cross of the Virtuti Militari
Recipients of the Cross of Valour (Poland)
1995 deaths
1918 births
Polish Royal Air Force pilots of World War II
Polish emigrants to the United Kingdom